Badlands Dinosaur Museum in Dickinson, North Dakota, United States, reopened on May 17, 2016, after over twenty years operating as Dakota Dinosaur Museum. It is part of the museum complex at Dickinson Museum Center.

The  museum includes dinosaur skeletons, skulls, and reconstructions, with dozens of displays featuring other fine fossils and minerals. Notable exhibits include international award-winning feathered dinosaur models, a complete Triceratops skull, an articulated hadrosaur arm with mummified skin, and full standing mounts of Allosaurus and Albertosaurus.

History 

"Dakota Dinosaur Museum" was the original name for the museum which was first proposed in 1987, and opened in 1994. The original exhibit included skeletons and models made by companies and artists from Utah, Texas, and North Dakota.  Most of the artifacts in the museum were donated by Larry and Alice League.

In 2015, ownership of the museum's fossil collection and related exhibits was transferred to the City of Dickinson. Under this new management, the museum reopened on May 17, 2016 as the Dinosaur Museum at Dickinson Museum Center. In 2017 the museum was renamed "Badlands Dinosaur Museum", as one of the first steps in a complete overhaul of the exhibits and museum infrastructure.

Opening hours 

The museum is open Mon-Sat, 9am-5pm year-round. In summer the museum is also open on Sundays 12pm-5pm.

References

External links
 Badlands Dinosaur Museum official website

Natural history museums in North Dakota
Museums established in 1994
Dinosaur museums in the United States
Museums in Stark County, North Dakota
Dickinson, North Dakota
Paleontology in North Dakota
1994 establishments in North Dakota